Ratepayers' Association in the United Kingdom and other countries is a name used by a political party or electoral alliance contesting a local election to represent the interests of those who pay rates to the municipal government. In Canada a ratepayers' association is the same thing as a neighbourhood association.

Rates are a property tax which provides a main source of funding for some local governments; the amount paid is usually proportional to the value of the property, and commercial premises may have higher rates than residences. Therefore a Ratepayers' Association is typically supported by property owners rather than tenants, and by business owners in particular, and has a platform of value-for-money and avoiding wasteful municipal spending. In the United Kingdom, local elections were on a ratepayer franchise until the 1910s, and Ratepayers' Associations remained prominent until the 1930s, when they lost ground to the three national parties; since the 1960s they have retained a role in scattered urban and suburban areas.

Examples include:
 Heald Green Ratepayers has represented the ward of Heald Green on Stockport Metropolitan Borough Council in England since 1927 (formerly on Gatley UDC prior to the creation of Stockport MBC)
 Citizens and Ratepayers (renamed "Communities and Residents" in 2012) controlled Auckland City Council for most of the years from 1938 to 1998
 Newtownabbey Ratepayers' Association had members on Newtownabbey Borough Council in Northern Ireland from 1997 to 2005
 Wolverhampton Association of Ratepayers had one or two seats on Wolverhampton City Council between 1975 and 1980
 Chingford Ratepayers' Association, which governed Municipal Borough of Chingford until 1965, was nominally independent of the Conservative Party; similarly in many other London boroughs in the early and mid 20th century
 Sligo Ratepayers Association won 8 of 24 seats in the 1919 Sligo Corporation election on an anti-corruption, pro-business ticket.

See also
 Residents' associations, such as the Residents Associations of Epsom and Ewell which governs Epsom and Ewell district in England
 Taxpayer groups, which advocate at a national level

References

Bibliography
 
 

Local and municipal elections